El Dorado High School is a public high school located in El Paso, Texas, United States.

Academics

The school offers International Baccalaureate, Advanced Placement program, dual credit, and Advancement Via Individual Determination (AVID) programs.

Athletics 
El Dorado athletics offers baseball, men's and women's basketball, cheerleading, men's and women's cross country, football, men's and women's soccer, softball, swimming, golf, tennis, track, women's volleyball, and wrestling.

Extra-curricular activities

Clubs
Architecture
Aztec Speech and Debate
Book Club
Business Professionals of America 
Chess Team
Crimestoppers
D.E.C.A.
Environmental Club
F.A.C.T.S
Feminism Club
The F.O.G.
French Club
Gifted and Talented Club
High Q
IB Creativity Action & Service Club 
IB Newsletter Committee
Library Book Club
Mock Trial
National Honor Society
National Technical Honor Society
PALS
Pep Squad
Principal Advisory Committee
Robotics
Skills USA
Student Council
SWAT Team
Student Ambassador 
T.A.F.E.
Theater
United States Academic Decathlon (U.S.A.D.)

Fine arts
Antigone
Art & Anime Club 
Choir
Cihuapilli Dancers
IB
It's Your World
Mahuitzli Flags
Marching band/concert band
Mariachi
Musical Theatre
Orchestra
Theater Society

References

External links
El Dorado High School website

Socorro Independent School District high schools
Educational institutions established in 2003
High schools in El Paso, Texas
2003 establishments in Texas